Kirulapone Grama Niladhari Division is a Grama Niladhari Division of the Thimbirigasyaya Divisional Secretariat of Colombo District of Western Province, Sri Lanka.

Kalubowila, Pamankada, Kirulapana, Kohuwala, Balapokuna Raja Maha Vihara and Dehiwala-Mount Lavinia are located within, nearby or associated with Kirulapone.

Kirulapone is a surrounded by the Pamankada East, Dutugemunu, Nugegoda West, Kirula and Wellawatta North Grama Niladhari Divisions.

Demographics

Ethnicity 

The Kirulapone Grama Niladhari Division has a Sinhalese majority (57.0%) and a significant Sri Lankan Tamil population (31.0%). In comparison, the Thimbirigasyaya Divisional Secretariat (which contains the Kirulapone Grama Niladhari Division) has a Sinhalese majority (52.8%), a significant Sri Lankan Tamil population (28.0%) and a significant Moor population (15.1%)

Religion 

The Kirulapone Grama Niladhari Division has a Buddhist majority (52.2%), a significant Hindu population (22.6%) and a significant Muslim population (10.1%). In comparison, the Thimbirigasyaya Divisional Secretariat (which contains the Kirulapone Grama Niladhari Division) has a Buddhist plurality (47.9%), a significant Hindu population (22.5%) and a significant Muslim population (17.4%)

Gallery

References 

Grama Niladhari Divisions of Thimbirigasyaya Divisional Secretariat